Lacq is a commune in the Pyrénées-Atlantiques department in southwestern France.

It lies just northwest of the prefecture (department capital) Pau.

Economy
In modern times the local economy has been based on the industrial use of subsurface petroleum reserves, and since 1951 on the extraction and development of a very large natural gas reservoir underneath the city. Processing of the large quantities of hydrogen sulfide in the gas have made Lacq a center of sulfur production.

See also
Communes of the Pyrénées-Atlantiques department

References

Communes of Pyrénées-Atlantiques
Pyrénées-Atlantiques communes articles needing translation from French Wikipedia